Steinkjerbuss AS is a bus company that operates in Steinkjer, Norway on contract with Nord-Trøndelag county municipality. It operates eighteen buses, including both school buses, scheduled buses and the city bus Buster.  It also provides chartered buses. The company was founded in 1998 as a merger between seven smaller bus companies in Steinkjer.

References

Bus companies of Trøndelag
Companies based in Steinkjer
Transport companies established in 1998
Steinkjer